Environmental planning is the process of facilitating decision making to carry out land development with the consideration given to the natural environment, social, political, economic and governance factors and provides a holistic framework to achieve sustainable outcomes. A major goal of environmental planning is to create sustainable communities, which aim to conserve and protect undeveloped land.

Elements 
Environmental planning concerns itself with the decision making processes where they are required for managing relationships that exist within and between natural systems and human systems. Environmental planning endeavors to manage these processes in an effective, orderly, transparent and equitable manner for the benefit of all constituents within such systems for the present and for the future. Present day environmental planning practices are the result of continuous refinement and expansion of the scope of such decision making processes.
Some of the main elements of present-day environmental planning are:

Social & economic development
Urban development
Regional development
Natural resource management & integrated land use
Infrastructure systems
Governance frameworks
 
The environmental planning assessments encompass areas such as land use, socio-economics, transportation, economic and housing characteristics, air pollution, noise pollution, the wetlands, habitat of the endangered species, flood zones susceptibility, coastal zones erosion, and visual studies among others, and is referred to as an Integrated environmental planning assessment.
It is the ability to analyze environmental issues that will facilitate critical decision making.

Many environmental planning actions currently revolve around the reduction of emissions and material reuse, not adaptations in order to lessen future climate change impacts. This is most frequently seen as a result of the difficulty of predicting the long term effects of climate change. Climate action is very complex in nature and the timeline of emissions mitigation is unpredictable. However, as an alternative to avoiding adaptation, several cities in the US have taken an "anticipatory governance" approach. This method intends to explore the uncertainty surrounding the impacts of climate change specific to their communities in order to include adaptation in their environmental planning.

Environmental Justice 
Environmental justice is the equitable inclusion and treatment of all human beings in all aspects of environmental planning, as well as in the enforcement of environmental legislation. It is increasingly recognized as a key part of environmental planning. Environmental justice issues are usually fought within communities to establish environmentally-friendly and accessible neighborhoods and living conditions, and to improve the local ecology. The Environmental Protection Agency has declared it essential that residents should play an active role in the reshaping of their neighborhoods.  Many levels of government and international organizations agree on the need for equitable and sustainable housing and transportation, as core characteristics of environmental justice; these are considered today a part of the battle against the climate crisis. Environmental activists act as watchdogs on government support for the battles of underrepresented communities against environmental hazards that threaten their health or way of life.

United States 
In the United States of America, there have been numerous examples of the state provisioning of environmental justice in multiple communities. Listed are some of such projects:

 The Phillips community in Minneapolis, Minnesota: The Phillips community began a campaign against the city of Minneapolis to halt the construction of a garbage transfer station in their neighborhood. The city was ordered for the demolition of twenty-eight homes for the site, amassing ten acres of land; this project was soon stopped by the aforementioned Phillips neighborhood. The people of Phillips established an organization known as the “Green Institute” afterwards in order to repurpose this vacant ten-acre lot. The Green Institute partnered with the city of Minneapolis to create sustainable business enterprises to ultimately bolster the job market while improving Minneapolis' environment by reducing waste and promoting clean energy techniques. With funding from the city government of Minneapolis, the Green Institute has established city-wide projects such as the "ReUse Center" and the "DeConstruction" service. The ReUse Center's services provide systems to repurpose scavenged construction materials so that building waste is reduced; the DeConstruction service assists those who want to collect discarded construction materials from demolition or building sites to reclaim. With these services, it is estimated that up to 75 percent of unused structures can be repurposed and then sold for new uses. This idea for the Green Institute, first drummed up by the citizens of the Phillips community, was quickly incorporated as a government-funded project that advocates for environmental justice.

North America

Canada 
In Canada, "Planners safeguard the health and well-being of urban and rural communities, by addressing the use of land, resources, facilities and services with consideration to physical, economic, and social efficiency" as stated on the Canadian Institute of Planners official website.

United States 
Local municipals around the US are implementing Climate Action Plans (CAPs) as urban areas grow. However, the level of detail is variable; some act more as motivational goals while others are a concrete plan for implementation. In the United States, for any project, environmental planners deal with a full range of environmental regulations from federal to state and city levels, administered federally by the Environmental Protection Agency. A rigorous environmental process has to be undertaken to examine the impacts and possible mitigation of any construction project was Depending on the scale and impact of the project, an extensive environmental review is known as an Environmental Impact Statement (EIS), and the less extensive version is Environmental Assessment (EA). Procedures follow guidelines from National Environmental Policy Act (NEPA), State Environmental Quality Review Act (SEQRA) and/or City Environmental Quality Review (CEQR), and other related federal or state agencies published regulations. Eccleston has developed a set of tools and techniques for solving NEPA and environmental planning problems. A study found that the best may to minimize information asymmetry and goal incongruence between organizations working to implement environmental policy is to focus on principle-agent dynamics thus avoiding conflict and allowing for progress in addressing environmental issues.

The Association of Environmental Professionals (AEP) is a non-profit organization of interdisciplinary professionals including environmental science, resource management, environmental planning and other professions contributing to this field. AEP is the first organization of its kind in the US, and its influence and model have spawned numerous other regional organizations throughout the United States. Its mission is to improve the technical skills of members, and the organization is dedicated to "the enhancement, maintenance and protection of the natural and human environment". From inception in the mid-1970s the organization has been closely linked with the maintenance of the California Environmental Quality Act (CEQA), due to California being one of the first states to adopt a comprehensive legal framework to govern the environmental review of public policy and project review.

Leadership in Energy and Environmental Design (LEED) in the major qualification system for green building. It is a certification system created by the U.S. Green Building Council (USGBC) and is used worldwide. The program includes certifications for new types of buildings as well as existing building that are candidates for modification. The multi-tiered point system enables building to be certified beyond local, state and federal standards. LEED standards play an important role in quantifying a building's environmental impact, encouraging  sustainable environmental practices, and acting as a hybrid between "material objects and human practices."

Asia

Philippines 
In the Philippines, the Republic Act 10587 governs the practice of Environmental Planning.  The law defines Environmental Planning as "a multi-disciplinary art and science of analyzing, specifying, clarifying, harmonizing, managing and regulating the use and development of land and water resources, in relation to their environs, for the development of sustainable communities and ecosystems.". It is sometimes referred to as urban and regional planning, city planning, town and country planning, and/or human settlements planning.

An Environmental Planner is a person who is registered and licensed to use environmental planning and who holds a valid Certificate of Registration and a valid Professional Identification Card from the Board of Environmental Planning and the Professional Regulation Commission of the Republic of the Philippines.  To be a licensed planner, one must pass the Environmental Planning Board Exam.  Areas of competency for planners are: 
 Physical Planning
 Social Planning
 Economic Planning
 Planning Law and Administration; and
 Special Planning Studies.

There is a current move to require in five years time the Bachelor of Science in Environmental Planning as a requisite for one to be a licensed environmental planner.  As of this writing, the curriculum for BS Environmental Planning is being reviewed by the Board of Environmental Planning and the Commission on Higher Education (CHED).

The only accredited organization for environmental planners in the Philippines is the Philippine Institute of Environmental Planners (PIEP).

Scope of Practice. –
REPUBLIC ACT NO. 10587
The practice of environmental planning, within the meaning and intent of this Act, shall embrace the following:

Providing professional services in the form of technical consultation, rendering of technical advice, plan preparation, capacity building and monitoring and evaluation of implementation involving the following:

National, regional or local development and/or physical framework and comprehensive land-use plans;
 Zoning and related ordinances, codes and other legal issuances for the development and management, preservation, conservation, rehabilitation, regulation and control of the environment, including all land, water, air and natural resources;
 Planning and development of a barangay, municipality, city, province, region or any portion or combination thereof; and
 Development of a site for a particular need or special purpose, such as economic or ecological zones; tourism development zones; and housing and other estate development projects, including the creation of any other spatial arrangement of buildings, utilities, transport and communications;
In relation to any of the activities enumerated in paragraph (1) above, preparing the following studies:
 Pre-feasibility, feasibility and other related concerns;
 Environmental assessments; and
 Institutional, administrative or legal systems;
 Curriculum and syllabi development in licensure examinations for environmental planners and teaching in academic institutions and conducting review courses in environmental planning;
 Serving as expert witness, resource person, lecturer, juror or arbitrator in hearings, competitions, exhibitions and other public fora; conduct of hearings, competitions, exhibits and other public fora;
 Ensuring compliance with environmental laws including the acquisition of regulatory permits.The Professional Regulatory Board, subject to approval of the Professional Regulation Commission, may add to, or exclude from, this section any activity or act of professional practice, or revise it as the need arises to conform to changes and new developments brought about by the latest trends in environmental planning; and
 Perform other acts or conduct other activities that may be determined by the Board, subject to approval by the Professional Regulation Commission in light of the trend of the practice of the profession.

Australia

Background
Table 1.0 depicts the changes of focus in planning over the last 300 years in Australia, which has evolved from an amenity and resource use focus to an integrated approach which espouses the stewardship of natural systems for the continued long term viability of both human and natural systems.

Regulatory framework 
Relevant environment protection, planning & administering agencies and legislation at the level of commonwealth, states & territories are as shown in table below.  Environmental planning policies vary from state to state.

Background 
The incorporation of environmental considerations in land-use planning in Australia began after the United Nations Conference on the Human Environment in Stockholm, Sweden in 1972. One of the key principles developed in reference to planning and human activity was:

Principle 13
In order to achieve a more rational management of resources and thus to improve the environment, States should adopt an integrated and coordinated approach to their development planning so as to ensure that development is compatible with the need to protect and improve environment for the benefit of their population.UNEP

Previous to this conference the United States Congress passed National Environmental Policy Act, which created a process whereby government agencies were required to publicly state and justify the environmental impacts of their development proposals by preparing an Environmental Impact Statement (EIS). The EIS structure was further developed by Burchell and Listokin (1975), and this approach has informed the development of environmental impact regulation worldwide (Beer 1977), and resulted in the development of legislation within several Australian states. Recent environmental planning processes 

New South Wales
In NSW the first attempt to incorporate environmental assessment and protection into planning law began in 1974 with the appointment of a Planning and Environment Commission to overhaul the existing predominately urban land-use system. After various delays the Environmental Planning and Assessment Act 1979 (EP&A Act) came into force on 1 September 1980. The EP&A Act incorporated a three tired system of State, Regional and Local levels of significance, and required the relevant control authority to take into consideration the impacts to the environment (both natural and built) and the community of proposed development or land-use change. Within the EP&A Act most development requires a Statement of Environmental Effects (SEE) or Review of Environmental Effects (REF) detailing the impacts to both natural and human environments, which should be taken into consideration by the regulatory authority. Significant projects require a more thorough Environmental Impact Assessment with a corresponding greater public scrutiny.

Concurrent with this development was the establishment of a parallel legal system, the Land and Environment Court, to arbitrate disputes. The EP&A Act has been amended over time, generally giving the government, acting through the Minister, greater powers to determine approval of development, particularly large projects of 'State Significance', but also to incorporate specific environmental laws, such as the Threatened Species Conservation Act 1995 (Park 2010).

Victoria
The Environment Effects Act 1978 was the first environmental planning control in Victoria, and it assessed the environmental impact of significant developments via an Environmental Effects Statement (EES). However the obligation for presenting an EES remained somewhat unclear and is ultimately at the discretion of the Minister for Planning (Eccles and Bryant 2007). The Planning and Environment Act 1987 created a statewide nested planning process, Victoria Planning Provisions (VPP) which has within the statewide objectives:"the protection of natural and man-made resources and the maintenance of ecological processes and genetic diversity" (PaE Act 1987, s4(1))

To achieve these ends, the VPP includes several overarching policy frameworks, including the identification of important environmental values and assets, such as 'protection of catchments, waterways and groundwater', 'coastal areas' and 'Conservation of native flora and fauna'. Below this level, local planning schemes identify land-uses through Zone designation, and also identify land affected by other criteria, called 'overlays'. Overlays include environmental parameters such as 'Environmental Significance', 'Vegetation Protection', 'Erosion Management' and 'Wildfire Management', but also social issues like 'Neighbourhood Character'. Below this again are various regulations on particular issues, such as details pertaining to regulation of areas of Native Vegetation DSE Victoria

Reform has occurred to the Victorian framework in recent years aimed at improving land use and transport outcomes including consideration of environmental impacts.  
The Transport Integration Act identifies key planning agencies as interface bodies required to have regard to a vision for the transport system and objectives and decision making principles if decisions are likely to have a significant impact on Victoria's transport system.  In addition, the Major Transport Projects Facilitation Act 2009 establishes a scheme to improve the approval and delivery of major rail, road and ports projects.

South Australia
Planning in South Australia is coordinated within the Development Act 1993. Under this law most urban and land-use planning is assessed against local plans of allowed development. The Minister must declare a proposed development either 'Major Development' or a 'Major Project' for it to be subjected to greater depth of environmental assessment and public consultation, via an independent Development Assessment Commission of experts. Complex proposals will generally require an indepth EIS. Planning SA

QueenslandThe Integrated Planning Act 1997 vested most planning control with local government, but required 'significant projects' to be assessed by a State Coordinator General and usually required an environmental impact statement (EIS).

This has been replaced by the Sustainable Planning Act 2009 which came into force 18 December 2009. This law aims to 'improve sustainable environmental outcomes through streamlined processes', and incorporates Statewide, Regional and local planning hierarchies, which follow the model of Victoria's VPP.  The Coordinator General may still declare projects to be 'significant projects' which then require assessment under the State Development and Public Works Organisation Act 1971 (Qld).

Key milestones and decisions

 Europe 
Over the past decade the European Union has given the environment more attention with more strict legislation on issues such as air, soil, and water pollution as well regulations for toxic and hazardous substances. Currently over 18% of the territory belonging to the EU is denoted as protected areas for nature. To date, the European Union's Environmental Policy is determined by the 7th Environmental Action Programme and is expected to be followed up through 2020. The EU has goals beyond this, however, and hopes by 2050 to have an "innovative, circular economy where nothing is wasted and where natural resources are managed sustainably, and biodiversity is protected, valued and restored in ways that enhance our society’s resilience."

The EU has three core objectives to help achieve this vision: conservation of natural resources, conversion to an efficient, environmentally sustainable economy, and protection of the health of citizens.

 Professional qualifications 
Environmental planning qualifications are offered in a number of forms by various universities throughout the world.

The following are some of the qualifications offered by tertiary education institutions:
 Bachelor of Resource and Environmental Planning
 Bachelor of Environmental Studies
 Bachelor of Planning and Environmental Policy
 Master in Environmental Planning e.g. at the Technische Universität Berlin 
 Master in Environmental Studies (planning)
 Bachelor of Urban and Environmental Planning
 Master of Urban Planning

 See also 

 Air quality
 Biogeochemistry
 Conservation development
 Disaster mitigation
 Eco-sufficiency
 Ecology
 Environmental design
 Green building
 Green development
 Greening
 Landscape planning
 List of environmental issues
 List of environmental organizations
 List of planning journals
 Natural landscape
 Noise pollution
 Passive solar building design
 Sustainable development
 Sustainable habitat
 Smart growth
 The Merton Rule
 Triad (environmental science)
 Timeline of environmental events
 Transition Towns
 Urban design
 Water quality

Cities
 Curitiba - a Brazilian city noted for its innovative public transit system and environmental planning.
 New York City - considered by many to be the most sustainable U.S. city with a population greater than one million because of its high population density and usage of mass transit.
 Reykjavík - the capital of Iceland known for its use of geothermal power.

 References 

 Notes 

 Bibliography 
 Beer A 1977 ‘Environmental Impact Analysis: A Review Article’ Town Planning Review 48(4):389
 Burchell RW and Listokin D 1975 The environmental impact handbook Center for Urban Policy Research, Rutgers, the State University, New Brunswick, N.J.
 Conacher A & Conacher J., Environment planning & management in Australia, Oxford University Press, 2000
 Eccles D & Bryant TL., 2007, Statutory planning in Victoria  Federation Press, Annandale
 Environmental planning for communities: a guide to the environmental visioning process utilizing a geographic information system (GIS), United States Environmental Protection Agency, Office of Research and Development, DIANE Publishing, Cincinnati, Ohio, 2000
 Park H 2010 ‘NSW Planning Framework: History of Reforms’ e-brief  pdf
 Petts, Judith, Handbook of environmental impact assessment, Volume 2'', Blackwell Publishing, 1999

External links 

 Dave Vergel . Castro & Associates
 Association of Environmental Professionals
 

 Australia
 Planning Institute of Australia
 Environmental Planning and Assessment Act 1979, NSW, Australia (An Act to institute a system of environmental planning and assessment for the State of New South Wales.), Parliament of NSW
 Department of Planning NSW
 in South Australia website
 Department of Planning website
 of Planning and Community Development website
 Queensland Department of Infrastructure and Planning website
 Infrastructure and Resource Information Service (IRIS) website
 State Law Publisher of Western Australia website
 Planning & Land Authority website
 Northern Territory Government website